The 1888 Indiana gubernatorial election was held on November 6, 1888. Republican nominee Alvin Peterson Hovey defeated Democratic nominee Courtland C. Matson with 49.03% of the vote.

General election

Candidates
Major party candidates
Alvin Peterson Hovey, Republican, U.S. Representative
Courtland C. Matson, Democratic, U.S. Representative

Other candidates
Jasper Hughes, Prohibition
John B. Mulroy, Union Labor

Results

References

1888
Indiana
Gubernatorial